Ahmed Salim Ould Sidi (1939 – after 16 March 1981) was a Mauritanian military and political leader and acting Prime Minister of Mauritania between 28 and 31 May 1979.

Biography 
He took part in coup d'état that overthrew Mustafa Ould Salek and helped Ahmed Ould Bouceif to become a Prime Minister. After Bouceif died in an airplane crash on 27 May 1979, Sidi temporarily took his place. On 31 May Mohamed Khouna Ould Haidalla replaced him and started to gather all political power in his hands. Sidi remained vice-president and chief of Military Committee for National Salvation until the beginning of 1980, when Haidalla eliminated all potential counter candidates. Soon he joined Alliance for Democratic Mauritania, connected to ex-president Moktar Ould Daddah. On 16 March 1981 he staged a coup d'état against Haidalla with the help of Mohamed Abdelkader, former air force commander. The putsch did not succeed and encouraged the president to take a harder course and abandon civil rule. Both Sidi and Abdelkader were executed soon after.

References 

1939 births
1981 deaths
Executed prime ministers
Mauritanian military personnel
Prime Ministers of Mauritania